Brian Dixon may refer to:
 Brian Dixon (Australian footballer) (born 1936), Australian rules footballer and politician
 Brian A. Dixon (born 1980), American author
 Brian Dixon (American football) (born 1990), American football player
 Brian Dixon (wrestling), British professional wrestling promoter
 Brian Dixon (bowls), South African lawn bowler
 Brian Dixon, drummer of Cathedral

See also
 Brian Dickson (1916–1998), Chief Justice of Canada